Maries is a village on the island of Thasos in northern Greece. The village is located in a valley located just south of the massif of Mount Ipsarion and its neighbouring peaks. The village is located 4.2 km northwest from the historic village of Theologos and 4.9 km northeast from the port town of Limenaria. The village is surrounded by a steep ravine (formerly iron mines) and is one of the oldest settlements on the island of Thasos. The only lake on the island of Thasos is located just north to the village of Maries.

References

External links
 Official municipality website

Populated places in Thasos